The 2015 FIA European Rallycross Championship was the thirty-ninth season of the FIA European Championships for Rallycross Drivers. The season consisted of five rounds, commencing on 16 May with the Belgian round at Circuit Jules Tacheny Mettet, and culminating on 18 October, in Italy at Franciacorta.

Calendar

Entries

Supercar

Super1600

TouringCar

RX Lites Cup

Championship Standings

Supercar

Super1600

TouringCar

References

External links

European Rallycross Championship seasons
European Rallycross Championship
2015 in European sport